Modern Man is a 2006 experimental drama about one man’s isolation and search for meaning. The film was directed, edited and photographed by Justin Swibel.

Plot 
The story takes place almost completely outdoors on a large estate. A man in his twenties inhabits the area, going about his daily upkeep of the property. In the final sequence, the young man plays piano, looks in a mirror with an air of satisfaction and showers with his clothes on.

Public exhibition 

The film opened December 1, 2006 at Laemmle's Sunset 5 theater in Los Angeles, CA. The film opened April 13, 2007 in New York City at City Cinemas' Village East theater.

Production 
The film features a soundscape created by sound designer Sean Garnhart (Ice Age, Robots). No production audio was recorded; the sound was created completely in post production using ADR, foley, and location audio recording.

External links 
 
 The New York Times review
 Modern Man on IMDB
 

2006 films
2006 drama films
American drama films
2000s English-language films
2000s American films